The 1968 Blue Swords was an international senior-level figure skating competition organized in Karl-Marx-Stadt, East Germany. Medals were awarded in the disciplines of men's singles, ladies' singles, pair skating and ice dancing. East Germany's Günter Zöller won his third consecutive title by defeating the Soviet Union's Valeri Meshkov and Vladimir Kurenbin. His teammate, Sonja Morgenstern, won her first Blue Swords title, outscoring Austria's Eva Kriegelstein. The Soviet Union's Lyudmila Pakhomova / Aleksandr Gorshkov won the ice dancing title for the second year in a row.

1968 was the first year that the competition was officially named Pokal der blauen Schwerter / Blue Swords.

Results

Men

Ladies

Pairs

Ice dancing 

Blue Swords
Blue Swords